Nikolai Fedorovich Naumenko (17 October 1901 – 7 July 1967) was a Soviet military aviator who commanded the 4th Air and 15th Air Army during the Second World War.

References

1901 births
1967 deaths
People from Mozdoksky District
People from Stavropol Governorate
Ukrainian people in the Russian Empire
Members of the Supreme Soviet of the Latvian Soviet Socialist Republic, 1947–1951
Soviet colonel generals
Soviet aviators
Soviet military personnel of the Russian Civil War
Soviet military personnel of the Winter War
Soviet military personnel of World War II
Recipients of the Order of Lenin
Recipients of the Order of the Red Banner
Recipients of the Order of Suvorov, 1st class
Recipients of the Order of Suvorov, 2nd class
Recipients of the Order of Kutuzov, 1st class